Heinrich Häser (15 October 1811 – 13 September 1885) was a German medical author.

Biography
He was born in Rome, the son of the musician August Ferdinand Häser (1779–1844). He studied medicine at the University of Jena, taught there from 1836 to 1849 (associate professor from 1839, full professor from 1846). Afterwards he worked as a professor at the universities of Greifswald (from 1849) and Breslau (from 1862).

He was an editor of the periodicals Archiv für die gesammte Medicin (1840–49) and Repertorium für die gesammte Medicin (1840–42).

Published works 
He edited:
 Christian Gottfried Gruner, Scriptores de Sudore Anglico (1847).
 Bibliotheca Epidemiographica (2nd edition, 1862).
 Repertorium für die gesamte Medizin (“Medical reports”; 1840–42).
 Archiv für die gesamte Medizin (“Medical archives”; 1840–49).
He wrote:
 Historisch-pathologische Untersuchungen ("Historical-pathological investigations"; 1839–41).
 Lehrbuch der Geschichte der Medizin und der Volkskrankheiten (“A primer of the history of medicine and popular diseases”; 3rd edition, 1875–82).
 Geschichte der christlichen Krankenpflege und Pflegerschaften (“History of Christian care for the sick and care givers”; 1857).
 Die Vaccination und ihre Gegner (“Vaccination and its opponents”; 1854).
 Buch der Bündth-Ertznei (“Book of Bündth-Ertznei”; 1868) Digital edition by the University and State Library Düsseldorf
 Grundriss der Geschichte der Medizin (“Outline of the history of medicine”; 1884).

References
 

1811 births
1885 deaths
German non-fiction writers
University of Jena alumni
19th-century German historians
Academic staff of the University of Jena
Academic staff of the University of Breslau
Academic staff of the University of Greifswald
German medical writers
German male non-fiction writers
19th-century German male writers